Line Branch is a  long 1st order tributary to the Dan River in Halifax County, Virginia.

Course 
Line Branch rises about 1 mile southeast of Dryburg, Virginia, and then flows south-southeast to join the Dan River about 1 mile northeast of Aarons Creek.

Watershed 
Line Branch drains  of area, receives about 45.2 in/year of precipitation, has a wetness index of 464.12, and is about 88% forested.

See also 
 List of Virginia Rivers

References 

Rivers of Virginia
Rivers of Halifax County, Virginia
Tributaries of the Roanoke River